In Greek mythology, Dorus ( probably derived from doron "gift") may refer to the following characters:

 Dorus, founder of the Dorian nation.
 Dorus, the Aetolian son of Apollo and Phthia, and brother of Laodocus and Polypoites. He was the father of Xanthippe, who married Pleuron, son of Aetolus, the man who killed Dorus and his brothers.
 Dorus, father of Cleues, a descendant of Agamemnon.

Notes

References 

 Apollodorus, The Library with an English Translation by Sir James George Frazer, F.B.A., F.R.S. in 2 Volumes, Cambridge, MA, Harvard University Press; London, William Heinemann Ltd. 1921. ISBN 0-674-99135-4. Online version at the Perseus Digital Library. Greek text available from the same website.
 Strabo, The Geography of Strabo. Edition by H.L. Jones. Cambridge, Mass.: Harvard University Press; London: William Heinemann, Ltd. 1924. Online version at the Perseus Digital Library.
 Strabo, Geographica edited by A. Meineke. Leipzig: Teubner. 1877. Greek text available at the Perseus Digital Library.

Children of Apollo
Demigods in classical mythology
Aetolian characters in Greek mythology